This page is a collection of VFL/AFL premiership and grand final statistics.  The Australian Football League (AFL), known as the Victorian Football League (VFL) until 1990, is the elite national competition in men's Australian rules football. Each year, the premiership is awarded to the club that wins the AFL Grand Final. The grand final has been played in all VFL/AFL seasons except for 1897 and 1924 (where the premiership was awarded without a grand final being played), and has been an annual tradition in its current format since 1931. 

This has had a significant impact on the spread of premierships: since 1990, fourteen clubs have won a premiership, compared with only five clubs between 1967 and 1989.  and  have won the most VFL/AFL premierships, with a total of 16 each. Of the teams currently competing in the Australian Football League, only , Gold Coast and  – three of the competition's four newest clubs – are yet to win a premiership.

Premierships by team

Table correct to the end of the 2022 season.

Premiership frequency

Table correct to the end of the 2021 season.

Premiership droughts

The following tables summarise the different premiership droughts for each club. The first table is limited to droughts lasting fifty or more seasons, while the other three are specific to each club (two of which span the entire competition, including all 21 teams). The duration of the drought is given as the number of full seasons contested between premierships; the season in which the drought is broken is considered to be part of the drought, and if the drought began from a club's entry to the league, the club's inaugural season is also considered to be part of the drought. Grand final replays are not included in grand final appearances.

Longest premiership droughts

Table correct to the end of the 2022 season.

Longest club premiership droughts

Table correct to the end of the 2022 season.

Current club premiership droughts

Table correct to the end of the 2022 season.

Time taken to win first premiership

Table correct to the end of the 2022 season.

Consecutive appearances

Consecutive premierships

Table correct to the end of the 2022 season.

Consecutive grand finals

1 Essendon drew the 1948 VFL Grand Final, and was defeated by Melbourne in the replay.
2 North Melbourne drew the 1977 VFL Grand Final, and defeated Collingwood in the replay.

Table correct to the end of the 2022 season.

Most common match-ups
The following table summarises the most common grand final match-ups (not including grand final replays).

Table correct to the end of the 2022 season.

Premierships at all levels

This table summarises premierships won at all levels of the VFL/AFL competition: the seniors, seconds/reserves (1919–1999), thirds/under-19s (1946–1991), night series (1956–2013) and AFL Women's (since 2017). Only AFL and AFLW premierships can currently be won; excluded from this table are premierships won by reserves teams competing in state leagues (including the VFL from 2000 onwards).

Table correct to the end of the 2022 AFL season.

Premierships across multiple grades in a season

During the years that it was achievable, no club ever won a senior, reserves, under-19s and night premiership in a single year.

Table correct to the end of the 2022 AFL season.

See also
 List of VFL/AFL premiers
 List of VFL/AFL premiership captains and coaches
 List of VFL/AFL pre-season and night series premiers
 List of AFL Women's premiers
 AFL Grand Final

Notes

References

Sources
 Australian Football League
 Full Points Footy
 AFL Tables

Australian Football League
Australian rules football records and statistics